Frederiksborg Amt is a former county (Danish: amt) in the north of the island of Zealand in eastern Denmark. Effective January 1, 2007, the county was abolished and merged into Region Hovedstaden (i.e. Copenhagen Capital Region).

List of County Mayors

Municipalities (1970-2006) 

Former counties of Denmark (1970–2006)
Capital Region of Denmark